Admiral Sir James Douglas, 1st Baronet (1703 – 2 November 1787) was a Scottish naval officer and Commodore of Newfoundland.

Naval career
Douglas became a captain in the Royal Navy in 1744. In 1745 he commanded HMS Mermaid at Louisbourg and in 1746 he commanded HMS Vigilante at Louisbourg. In 1746 he was appointed Commodore, Newfoundland Station, by Vice-Admiral Isaac Townsend. He then served as a Member of Parliament for Orkney & Shetland from 1754 to 1768.

In 1757 Douglas served as a member of the court-martial which tried and convicted Admiral Byng and in 1759 he was knighted for his participation in the capture of Québec. 

He became commander-in-chief of the Leeward Islands Station and was commander of the squadron which captured Dominica in 1761. He served in the fleet under George Rodney which captured Martinique in February 1762 and then served in the fleet under George Pocock which captured Havana in August 1762. He became Commander-in-Chief, Jamaica Station, later in the year.

Promoted to vice-admiral in 1770, he became Commander-in-Chief, Portsmouth, in 1774 and was then promoted to admiral in 1778. In 1786 he was made a Baronet, of Maxwell, Roxburgh Baronetcy.

Family

Douglas was the son of George Douglas, 7th laird of Friarshaw, Roxburghshire, and Elizabeth, daughter of Sir Patrick Scott, baronet, of Ancrum, also of Roxburghshire. This Douglas line descended from the Douglas of Cavers branch of the family, and were lawyers and merchants. They took the title Douglas of Friarshaw from the original seat of the family in the parish of Lilliesleaf.

Douglas was twice married: first in 1753 to Helen (d. 1766), daughter of Thomas Brisbane of Brisbane in Ayrshire; the couple had four sons, including Admiral James Douglas (1755–1839) and three daughters. His second wife was Lady Helen Boyle, daughter of John Boyle, 2nd Earl of Glasgow, and Helenor, née Morison.

Sir George Douglas, 2nd Baronet, was a captain in the 25th Regiment of Foot and later commanded the Kelso Volunteers. He sold the old estate of Friarshaw in 1788 and became MP for Roxburgh.

See also 
 Great Britain in the Seven Years War
 Governors of Newfoundland
 List of people from Newfoundland and Labrador

Notes

References

|-

|-

1703 births
1787 deaths
Baronets in the Baronetage of Great Britain
Members of the Parliament of Great Britain for Scottish constituencies
British MPs 1754–1761
British MPs 1761–1768
Governors of Newfoundland Colony
Royal Navy admirals
British military personnel of the French and Indian War
Royal Navy personnel of the War of the Austrian Succession